Practical Reptile Keeping is a monthly herpetology magazine published by Kelsey Media in the United Kingdom. The magazine  focuses on all aspects of Reptilekeeping, including Species information and Caresheets.

The magazine was first released in 2009 and is funded by Ad revenue from Reptile stores and websites.

References

External links
Official Website
Kelsey Publishing Group

Monthly magazines published in the United Kingdom
English-language magazines
Herpetological literature
Magazines established in 2009